Dancehall is a genre of Jamaican popular music that originated in the late 1960s. Initially, dancehall was a more sparse version of reggae than the roots style, which had dominated much of the 1970s. In the mid-1980s, digital instrumentation became more prevalent, changing the sound considerably, with digital dancehall (or "ragga") becoming increasingly characterized by faster rhythms. Key elements of dancehall music include its extensive use of Jamaican Patois rather than Jamaican standard English and a focus on the track instrumentals (or "riddims").

Dancehall saw initial mainstream success in Jamaica in the 1980s, and by the 1990s, it became increasingly popular in Jamaican diaspora communities. In the 2000s, dancehall experienced worldwide mainstream success, and by the 2010s, it began to heavily influence the work of established Western artists and producers, which has helped to further bring the genre into the Western music mainstream.

History

Early developments
Dancehall is named after Jamaican dance halls in which popular Jamaican recordings were played by local sound systems.

They began in the late 1940s among people from the inner city of Kingston, who were not able to participate in dances uptown. Social and political changes in late-1970s Jamaica, including the change from the socialist government of Michael Manley (People's National Party) to Edward Seaga (Jamaica Labour Party), were reflected in the shift away from the more internationally oriented roots reggae towards a style geared more towards local consumption and in tune with the music that Jamaicans had experienced when sound systems performed live. Themes of social injustice, repatriation and the Rastafari movement were overtaken by lyrics about dancing, violence and sexuality. Though the revolutionary spirit was present in Jamaica due to this social upheaval, the radio was very conservative and failed to play the people's music. It was this gap that the sound system was able to fill with music that the average Jamaican was more interested in.

Musically, older rhythms from the late 1960s were recycled, with Sugar Minott credited as the originator of this trend when he voiced new lyrics over old Studio One rhythms between sessions at the studio, where he was working as a session musician. In the 1970s, Big Youth, U Roy, and I Roy were famous DJs. Around the same time, producer Don Mais reworked old rhythms at Channel One Studios, using the Roots Radics band. The Roots Radics would go on to work with Henry "Junjo" Lawes on some of the key early dancehall recordings, including those that established Barrington Levy, Frankie Paul, and Junior Reid as major reggae stars. Other singers to emerge in the early dancehall era as major stars included Don Carlos, Al Campbell, and Triston Palma, while more established names such as Gregory Isaacs and Bunny Wailer successfully adapted.

Sound systems such as Killimanjaro, Black Scorpio, Silver Hawk, Gemini Disco, Virgo Hi-Fi, Volcano Hi-Power and Aces International soon capitalized on the new sound and introduced a new wave of deejays. The older toasters were overtaken by new stars such as Captain Sinbad, Ranking Joe, Clint Eastwood, Lone Ranger, Josey Wales, Charlie Chaplin, General Echo and Yellowman — a change reflected by the 1981 Junjo Lawes-produced album A Whole New Generation of DJs, although many went back to U-Roy for inspiration. Deejay records became, for the first time, more important than records featuring singers. Another trend was sound clash albums, featuring rival deejays /or sound systems competing head-to-head for the appreciation of a live audience, with underground sound clash cassettes often documenting the violence that came with such rivalries.

Yellowman, one of the most successful early dancehall artists, became the first Jamaican deejay to be signed to a major American record label, and for a time enjoyed a level of popularity in Jamaica to rival Bob Marley's peak. The early 1980s also saw the emergence of female deejays in dancehall music, such as Lady G, Lady Saw, and Sister Nancy. Other female dancehall stars include artistes like Diana King and in the late 1990s to the 2000s Ce'cile, Spice, Macka Diamond and more.
 Beenie Man, Bounty Killer, Mad Cobra, Ninjaman, Buju Banton, and Super Cat becoming major DJs in Jamaica.

With a little help from deejay sound, "sweet sing" (falsetto voice) singers such as Pinchers, Cocoa Tea, Sanchez, Admiral Tibet, Frankie Paul, Half Pint, Courtney Melody, and Barrington Levy were popular in Jamaica.

Origination from the DJ scene
Sound systems and the development of other musical technology heavily influenced dancehall music. The music needed to "get where the radio didn't reach" because Jamaicans often were outside without radios. Especially because the audience of dancehall sessions were lower-class people, it was extremely important that they be able to hear music. Sound systems allowed people to listen to music without having to buy a radio. Therefore, the dancehall culture grew as the use of technology and sound systems got better.

The Jamaican dancehall scene was one created out of creativity and a desire for accessibility, and one that is inseparable from sound system culture. The term 'Dancehall', while now typically used in reference to the specific and uniquely Jamaican genre of music, originally referred to a physical location. This location was always an open-air venue from which DJs and later "Toasters", a precursor to MCs, could perform their original mixes and songs for their audience via their sound systems. The openness of the venue paired with the innately mobile nature of the sound system, allowed performers to come to the people. At the onset of the dancehall scene, sound systems were the only way that some Jamaican audiences might hear the latest songs from popular artist. Through time, it transformed to where the purveyors of the sound systems were the artists themselves and they became whom the people came to see along with their own original sounds. With the extreme volume and low bass frequencies of the sound systems local people might very well feel the vibrations of the sounds before they could even hear them, though the sound itself did travel for miles. This visceral sensory pleasure acted as an auditory beacon, redefining musical experience.

Jamaica was one of the first cultures to pioneer the concept of remixing. As a result, production level and sound system quality were critical to Jamaica's budding music industry. Since many locals couldn't afford sound systems in their home, listening to one at a dance party or at a festival was their entry into audible bliss. Writer Brougtton and Brewster's book Last Night a DJ Saved My Life states that sound systems were a product of Jamaican social lifestyle. The success of music wasn't just in the hands of one person anymore, it was a factor of the DJ, speaking poetic words to the audience, the Selector, harmonizing beats in an aesthetically pleasing way, and the Sound Engineer, wiring the sound systems to handle deeper and louder bass tones. Music became a factor of many elements and the physicality of that sound was a strategic puzzle left for musicians to solve.

Dancehall 1980s–1990s 
InnerCity Promotions Led by Mike Tomlinson And Lois Grant played a very significant role in the development of Jamaica's popular "DanceHall" music. Their promotion company through a series of concerts led to the then emerging music from which they labelled, "DanceHall." The team started a series called "Saturday Night Live" at Harbour View Drive-In. US soul group Gladys Knight and the Pips headlined the initial concert and the showcase also featured boxing presentations from Muhammed Ali. InnerCity Promotions was responsible for establishing and promoting numerous events, their first DanceHall concert was staged in 1984. This was significant because it marked the beginnings of the music's recognition as the "DanceHall" genre. Mr. Tomlinson recalls the opposition received from journalist, radio and TV managers at the time, some who refused to run the commercials or play the music to promote the DanceHall series. Dancehall musicians such as U-Roy, I-Roy, Admiral Bailey, Mikey "lickShot" Palmer, Half Pint, Tenor Saw, Charlie Chaplain(Jamaica), Leroy Sibbles, Papa San, Lieutenant Stitchie, Super Cat, General Trees, Ninjaman, Shabba Ranks, Buju Banton, Yellow Man, Pinchers, Courtney Melody, Jose Wales, Barrington Levy, Mad Cobra, Sugar Minott and Shinehead were popular during the 80s. The series continued into the early 1990s, the team Mike Tomlinson and Lois Grant played an important role in nurturing and promoting the young talents of the inner city and sound system culture of that era. Through their DanceHall live concerts, many performers found a place to use their voice and make a mark due to the opportunities afforded by InnerCity Promotions. This is from the International Reggae Awards special awarded honors(irawma awards).

King Jammy's 1985 hit, "(Under Me) Sleng Teng" by Wayne Smith, with an entirely-digital rhythm hook took the dancehall reggae world by storm. Many credit this song as being the first digital rhythm in reggae, featuring a rhythm from a digital keyboard. However, The "Sleng Teng" rhythm was used in over 200 subsequent recordings. This deejay-led, largely synthesized chanting with musical accompaniment departed from traditional conceptions of Jamaican popular musical entertainment.

Dub poet Mutabaruka said, "if 1970s reggae was red, green and gold, then in the next decade it was gold chains". It was far removed from reggae's gentle roots and culture, and there was much debate among purists as to whether it should be considered an extension of reggae.

This shift in style again saw the emergence of a new generation of artists, such as Sean Paul, Capleton, Beenie Man and Shabba Ranks, who became famous ragga stars. A new set of producers also came to prominence: Philip "Fatis" Burrell, Dave "Rude Boy" Kelly, George Phang, Hugh "Redman" James, Donovan Germain, Bobby Digital, Wycliffe "Steely" Johnson and Cleveland "Clevie" Brown (aka Steely & Clevie) rose to challenge Sly & Robbie's position as Jamaica's leading rhythm section.

Dancehall in the 2000s

By the early 2000s, Dancehall had gained mainstream popularity in Jamaica, as well as in the United States, Canada, Australasia and Western parts of Europe. This was first seen with artists such as Sean Paul, whose single "Get Busy" (2003) became the first dancehall single to reach number one on the US Billboard Hot 100.

Unlike earlier Dancehall, this new evolution was characterized by structures of music commonly heard in mainstream pop music, such as repeated choruses, melodic tunes, and hooks. Some lyrics were cleaner and featured less sexual content and profanity.

Some of the artists who popularised this new era of Dancehall were Bounty Killer, Beenie Man, Elephant Man, Popcaan, Vybz Kartel, Konshens, Mr. Vegas, Mavado, Ward 21, Lady Saw and Spice, some of whom saw international success.

Modern dancehall: 2015—present
Dancehall saw a new wave of popularity in Western markets in the mid-late 2010s, with immense commercial success being achieved by a number of dancehall-pop singles, including  Rihanna's "Work" (2016) and Drake's "One Dance" and "Controlla" (2016).

A variety of western artists have spoken of being inspired by Dancehall music, including Major Lazer, whose commercially successful singles Lean On (2015), Light It Up (2015) and Run Up (2017) all heavily rely upon dancehall music. Several hip-hop and R&B artists have also released material inspired by dancehall music, including Drake, who has cited Vybz Kartel as one of his "biggest inspirations."

In 2014, Drake took an interest into Popcaan and linked him up with MixPak producer Dre Skull to release his debut album 'Where We Come From'. This saw huge commercial success and went on to receive a UK MOBO award for Best Reggae Album in 2015. The year of 2016 saw Popcaan's rival-artist Alkaline release his debut album 'New Level Unlocked' under DJ Frass Records, which topped the charts in Jamaica, as well as being well received in the US and UK.

Popcaan and Alkaline have always been rival music artists in Jamaica and it is much debated who is the new Dancehall King, since Vybz Kartel was incarcerated in 2011. It has been said that Popcaan's success is largely due to early support from Vybz Kartel(KOTD) and more recent support from Drake.

By 2016, Dancehall had re-emerged into global popularity, artists such as Alkaline, Popcaan, Masicka, Aidonia and Rygin King are known as some of the most profound and active artists of this period to date.

Since 2017, Dancehall artists from Jamaica have been frequently collaborating with UK acts such as Chip, Stefflon Don and J Hus. This is well in-tune with the boost of urban acts in the UK rising up, and the re-birth of Grime in 2014.

In the late 2010s, a new wave of artists rose to popularity in Jamaica. These artists come from rural parishes, especially Montego Bay, outside of the commercial center of the Jamaican music industry. They are influenced by American trap music, and sometimes refer to lottery scamming in their lyrics. Some of the most popular artists in this style are Chronic Law, Rygin King, and Squash.

The changing sounds in dancehall have largely been down to the producers behind the tracks. The most notable producers creating the new sound of Jamaica today are: DJ Frass, Notnice, and Lee Milla.

Musical characteristics 
Three major elements of Jamaican dancehall music are the use of digital instruments, particularly the Casio Casiotone MT-40 electronic keyboard, the Oberheim DX drum machine, and the use of riddims, instrumentals to which lyrics are added, resulting in an unusual process of creating songs from separate components. More specifically, many riddims are created using digital instruments like the MT-40, a practice that first became popular in 1985 with the release of 'Under Mi Sleng Teng,' whose success made the accessibility of digitally-composed riddims apparent (Manuel-Marshall, p. 453).

Riddims 
A single riddim can be used in multiple songs, paired with different sets of lyrics, and the inverse is also possible with a single set of lyrics being attached to different riddims.  Riddims and lyric sets are not exclusive to any one artist, and these can be and are spread around with one particular riddim, 'Real Rock,' first recorded in 1967 for a song of the same name, being used in at least 269 songs by 2006 over the course of 39 years. Peter Manuel and Wayne Marshall noted in 2006 that most songs were set to one of about a dozen riddims that were in vogue, with the exceptions being the work of individual, often high-ranked, artists. Recording over riddims forms the basis of dancehall, with modern dancehall layering vocals over ostinatos; the DJs providing the vocals thus, in the words of Manuel and Marshall, carry the song, unlike older dancehall where vocals were interwoven with full songs.

These practices' roots can be described with the concept of families of resemblance as coined by George Lipsitz in 1986 – similarities between other groups' experiences and cultures (Lipsitz, p. 160). Here, the term might describe the links between different artists via shared riddims and lyric sets and through common experiences incorporated into the music.

Culture

Donna P. Hope defines dancehall culture as a "space for the cultural creation and dissemination of symbols and ideologies that reflect the lived realities of its adherents, particularly those from the inner cities of Jamaica." Dancehall culture actively creates a space for its "affectors" (creators of dancehall culture) and its "affectees" (consumers of dancehall culture) to take control of their own representation, contest conventional relationships of power, and exercise some level of cultural, social and even political autonomy.

Kingsley Stewart outlines ten of the major cultural imperatives or principles that constitute the dancehall worldview. They are:

 It involves the dynamic interweaving of God and Haile Selassie
 It acts as a form of stress release or psycho-physiological relief
 It acts as a medium for economic advancement
 The quickest way to an object is the preferred way (i.e., the speed imperative)
 The end justifies the means
 It strives to make the unseen visible
 Objects and events that are external to the body are more important than internal processes; what is seen is more important than what is thought (i.e., the pre-eminence of the external)
 The importance of the external self; the self is consciously publicly constructed and validated
 The ideal self is shifting, fluid, adaptive, and malleable, and
 It involves the socioexistential imperative to transcend the normal (i.e., there is an emphasis on not being normal).

Such a drastic change in the popular music of the region generated an equally radical transformation in fashion trends, specifically those of its female faction. In lieu of traditional, modest "rootsy" styles, as dictated by Rastafari-inspired gender roles; women began donning flashy, revealing – sometimes X-rated outfits. This transformation is said to coincide with the influx of slack lyrics within dancehall, which objectified women as apparatuses of pleasure. These women would team up with others to form "modeling posses", or "dancehall model" groups, and informally compete with their rivals.

This newfound materialism and conspicuity was not, however, exclusive to women or manner of dress. Appearance at dance halls was exceedingly important to acceptance by peers and encompassed everything from clothing and jewelry, to the types of vehicles driven, to the sizes of each respective gang or "crew", and was equally important to both sexes.

One major theme behind dancehall is that of space. Sonjah Stanley Niaah, in her article "Mapping Black Atlantic Performance Geographies", says

Dancehall occupies multiple spatial dimensions (urban, street, police, marginal, gendered, performance, liminal, memorializing, communal), which are revealed through the nature and type of events and venues, and their use and function. Most notable is the way in which dancehall occupies a liminal space between what is celebrated and at the same time denigrated in Jamaica and how it moves from private community to public and commercial enterprise.A Story of Space and Celebration, by Sonjah Stanley Niaah.

In Kingston's Dancehall: A Story of Space and Celebration, she writes:

Dancehall is ultimately a celebration of the disenfranchised selves in postcolonial Jamaica that occupy and creatively sustain that space. Structured by the urban, a space that is limited, limiting, and marginal yet central to communal, even national, identity, dancehall's identity is as contradictory and competitive as it is sacred. Some of Jamaica's significant memories of itself are inscribed in the dancehall space, and therefore dancehall can be seen as a site of collective memory that functions as ritualized memorializing, a memory bank of the old, new, and dynamic bodily movements, spaces, performers, and performance aesthetics of the New World and Jamaica in particular.

These same notions of dancehall as a cultural space are echoed in Norman Stolzoff's Wake the Town and Tell the People. He notes that dancehall is not merely a sphere of passive consumerism, but rather is an alternative sphere of active cultural production that acts as a means through which black lower-class youth articulate and project a distinct identity in local, national, and global contexts. Through dancehall, ghetto youths attempt to deal with the endemic problems of poverty, racism, and violence, and in this sense the dancehall acts as a communication center, a relay station, a site where black lower-class culture attains its deepest expression. Thus, dancehall in Jamaica is yet another example of the way that the music and dance cultures of the African diaspora have challenged the passive consumerism of mass cultural forms, such as recorded music, by creating a sphere of active cultural production that potentially may transform the prevailing hegemony of society.

In Out and Bad: Toward a Queer Performance Hermeneutic in Jamaican Dancehall Nadia Ellis explicates the culture of combined homophobia and unabashed queerness within Jamaican dancehall culture. She details the particular importance of the phrase "out and bad" to Jamaica when she writes, "This phrase is of queer hermeneutical possibility in Jamaican dancehall because it registers a dialectic between queer and gay that is never resolved, that relays back and forth, producing an uncertainty about sexual identity and behavior that is usefully maintained in the Jamaican popular cultural context." In discussion of the possibility of a self identifying homosexual dancer performing to homophobic music she writes, "In appropriating the culture and working from within its very center, he produces a bodily performance that gains him power. It is the power or mastery, of parody, and of getting away with it."

Ellis not only examines the intersection of queerness and masculinity within the Jamaican dancehall scene, but suggests that the overt homophobia of certain dancehall music actually creates a space for queer expression. In general, homosexuality and queerness are still stigmatized in dancehalls. In fact, some of the songs used during dancehall sessions contain blatant homophobic lyrics. Ellis argues, however, this explicit, violent rhetoric is what creates a space for queer expression in Jamaica. She describes the phenomenon of all male dance groups that have sprung up within the dancehall scene. These crews dress in matching, tight clothing, often paired with makeup and dyed hair, traditional hallmarks of queerness within Jamaican culture. When they perform together, it is the bodily performance that give the homosexual dancers power.

Dances 
The popularity of dancehall has spawned dance moves that help to make parties and stage performances more energetic. Dancing is an integral part of bass culture genres. As people felt the music in the crowded dancehall venues, they would do a variety of dances. Eventually, dancehall artists started to create songs that either invented new dances or formalized some moves done by dancehall goers. Many dance moves seen in hip hop videos are actually variations of dancehall dances. Examples of such dances are: "Like Glue", "Bogle", "Whine & Dip", "Tek Weh Yuhself", "Whine Up", "Shake It With Shaun" (a mix of various genres), "Boosie Bounce", "Drive By", "Shovel It", "To Di World", "Dutty Wine", "Sweep", "Nuh Behavior", "Nuh Linga", "Skip to My Lou", "Gully Creepa", "Breakdancing" ,"Bad Man Forward Bad Man Pull Up", "Keeping it Jiggy", "Pon Di River", "One Drop", "Whine & Kotch", "Bubbling", "Tic Toc", "Willie Bounce", "Wacky Dip", "Screetchie", "One Vice" and "Daggering".

Criticisms

Cultural elements
Dancehall combines elements of materialism and stories of hardships of Kingston, Jamaica. This is seen in the use of gun talk by artists like Buju Banton and Capleton, or the sporting of bling-bling by "Gangsta Ras" artists like Mavado and Munga. The term Gangsta Ras, which combines thuggish imagery with Rastafari is according to Rasta critics, an example of how in dancehall, "the misuse of Rastafari culture has diluted and marginalised the central tenets and creed of the Rastafari philosophy and way of life".

Kingsley Stewart points out that artists sometimes feel an "imperative to transcend the normal", exemplified by artists like Elephant Man and Bounty Killer doing things to stand out, such as putting on a synthetic cartoonish voice or donning pink highlights while constantly re-asserting hypermasculine attributes. Donna P. Hope argues that this trend is related to the rise of market capitalism as a dominant feature of life in Jamaica, coupled with the role of new media and a liberalized media landscape, where images become of increasing importance in the lives of ordinary Jamaicans who strive for celebrity and superstar status on the stages of dancehall and Jamaican popular culture.

Another point of dissension of dancehall from reggae, and from its non-western roots in Jamaica, is on the focus on materialism. Dancehall has also become popular in regions such as Ghana and Panama. Prominent males in the dancehall scene are expected to dress in very expensive casual wear, indicative of European urban styling and high fashion that suggest wealth and status. Since the late 1990s, males in the dancehall culture have rivalled their female counterparts to look fashioned and styled. The female dancehall divas are all scantily clad, or dressed in spandex outfits that accentuate more than cover the shape of the body. In the documentary It's All About Dancing, prominent dancehall artist Beenie Man argues that one could be the best DJ or the smoothest dancer, but if one wears clothing that reflects the economic realities of the majority of the partygoers, one will be ignored, and later Beenie Man returned to perform as Ras Moses.

Guns and violent imagery 
According to Carolyn Cooper in Sound Clash, written in 2004, dancehall music and its following were frequently attacked for frequent references to guns and violence in lyrics, with Cooper responding by arguing that the emergence of firearms was less a sign of genuinely violent undercurrents in dancehall and more a theatrical adoption of the role of guns as tools of power. That ties into the concepts of the badman, a defiant, rebellious figure who often use a gun to maintain a level of respect and fear.  Said concepts, Cooper argues, originate in historical resistance to slavery and emulation of imported films, specifically North American action films with gun-wielding protagonists.

Adding to the concept of gunfire as theatrical element is the use of gunfire as a way to show support for a performing DJ or singer, which eventually gave way to flashing cigarette lighters, displaying glowing cellphone monitors, and igniting aerosol sprays. Gunfire as a form of cheering has extended beyond dancehall culture with the phrase "pram, pram!" becoming a general expression of approval or support.

However, Cooper's assessment of the presence of guns in Jamaican dancehall is not wholly uncritical, with a discussion of Buju Banton's 'Mr. Nine' interpreting the song as a denouncement of what Cooper describes as gun culture gone out of control.

Part of the criticism of Jamaican dancehall appears to be the product of cultural clash stemming from a lack of insider knowledge on the nuances of the music's content and the culture surrounding said music.  This struggle is something ethnomusicologists struggle with, even within an academic setting, with Bruno Nettl describing in The Study of Ethnomusicology how "insider" and "outsider" viewpoints would reveal different understandings on the same music. Indeed, Nettl later mentions growing questions of who ethnomusicological studies benefited, especially from the groups being studied.  And even then, in May It Fill Your Soul, Timothy Rice mentioned that even insider scholars required a level of distanciation to scrutinize their own cultures as needed.

Anti-gay lyrics

After the popularizing of Buju Banton's dancehall song "Boom Bye Bye" in the early 1990s, dancehall music came under criticism from international organizations and individuals over anti-gay lyrics. In some cases, dancehall artists whose music featured anti-gay lyrics have had their concerts cancelled. Various singers were investigated by international law enforcement agencies such as Scotland Yard, on the grounds that the lyrics incited the audience to assault gay people. For example, Buju Banton's 1993 hit "Boom Bye Bye" advocates the violent assaults and murders of gay people. Another example, T.O.K.'s song "Chi Chi Man" which advocates the killing of gay men and women.

Some of the affected singers believed that legal or commercial sanctions were an attack against freedom of speech and were affected by anti-Black attitudes in the music industry internationally.  Many artists have over time apologized for their mistreatment of LGBTQ+ communities, particularly in Jamaica, and agreed to not use anti-gay lyrics nor continue to perform or profit off their previously anti-gay music.  "Stop Murder Music" is/was a movement against homophobia in dancehall music. This movement actively targeted homophobia in dancehall music and was partially initiated by a controversial UK based group OutRage! and supported by the Black Gay Men's Advisory Group (UK based) and J-Flag (Jamaica based). It led to some dancehall artists signing the Reggae Compassionate Act. Dancehall artist Mista Majah P has created dancehall music more recently that celebrates and advocates for LGBTQ+ people.

Some artists agreed not to use anti-gay lyrics during their concerts in certain countries internationally because their concerts kept being protested and cancelled. However, this fails to address the most serious effects of the anti-gay lyrics in dancehall music which are on the LGBTQ+ people of Jamaica, where this music is most present.

The global treatment of dancehall can often represent the continued anti-Black association of homophobia with Blackness. For example, dancehall artists that have not used anti-gay lyrics and even write music advocating for gay rights have been excluded internationally from certain spaces because it is assumed they are homophobic. Additionally, groups internationally have acted as though the gay-rights criticism of homophobic dancehall songs or artists is not important to Black communities. This represents the anti-Black and anti-gay attitude that work to erase intersectional Black LGBTQ+ identities. In fact, many LGBTQ+ Black people, particularly with connections to Jamaica, continue to experience the complexities of dancehall music, both culturally important and at times deeply violent. This is demonstrated in the film "Out and Bad: London's LGBT Dancehall Scene" which discusses the experience of a group of LGBTQ+ Black, and mostly Jamaican, people in London. Dancehall is important to their culture, both in connection with Jamaican heritage and in how social interactions are constructed around dance and music. However, it is discussed how many dancehall songs contain homophobic and transphobic lyrics. One interviewee comments "We still enjoy ourselves to these kinds of music because [what matters to us is] the rhythm of the music, the beat, the way the music makes us feel."

Scholars have theorized around the significance and meaning around the use of anti-gay lyrics in dancehall music. Donna P. Hope argues that dancehall culture's anti-gay lyrics formed part of a macho discussion that advanced the interest of the heterosexual male in Jamaica, which is a Christian society with strong Rastafari movement influence as well. Dancehall culture in Jamaica often included imagery of men dressing and dancing in a way stereotypically associated with gay-male style. However, the cultural, religious, and social gender-norms continued to advance the ideal man as macho and heterosexual, any divergence from this would be identified as inadequate and impure portraits of true masculinity.

Some authors have suggested that this duality, the presentation of "queerness," in dance style and dress, and the violent homophobia, in dancehall spaces can be explained by the ritualistic "doing away with 'homosexuality'." Scholar Nadia Ellis suggests that when songs with homophobic lyrics are played, the environment of dancehall spaces can become serious and individuals can use the opportunity to reinstate their allegiance to heteronormativity. These songs thus act to "consecrate" the spaces as straight and masculine. In the safety this ritualized hetero-normativity creates, the space may be opened to more free expression and participants can then more openly engage with styles and dancing that might have been seen as queer. Ellis writes: "The songs are played; no one is 'gay'; everyone can turn a blind eye."

The  backlash to Banton's violently anti-gay "Boom Bye-Bye", and the reality of Kingston's violence which saw the deaths of deejays Pan Head and Dirtsman saw another shift, this time back towards Rastafari and cultural themes, with several of the hardcore slack ragga artists finding religion, and the "conscious ragga" scene becoming an increasingly popular movement. A new generation of singers and deejays emerged that harked back to the roots reggae era, notably Garnett Silk, Tony Rebel, Sanchez, Luciano, Anthony B and Sizzla. Some popular deejays, most prominently Buju Banton and Capleton, began to cite Rastafari and turn their lyrics and music in a more conscious, rootsy direction. Many modern dancehall Rasta artists identify with Bobo Ashanti.

Women's message of power and control 
Dancehalls are used to communicate messages of women's power and control in a protest against their gendered experience embedded in Jamaican culture. Danger, a dancehall queen and the winner of the International Dancehall Queen Competition in 2014, expresses her power through dancehalls as she explains: "We are queens, we are not afraid to go out there to do what we want to, demand what we want, and to live how we want, and represent women all over the world and to let them know it is okay to be yourself and that it is ok to not hold back"  Raquel, also known as Dancing Princess, describes her ability to communicate through the dancehall: "What you've lived, what you feel, put it in the dance. That's what dance is, expressing with your body what you feel and who you are. (...) dancehall is the way of the woman to say no, I am a woman respect me." As evidenced by these women, dancehall is a space that allows for women to be empowered and to communicate their liberation from the boundaries imposed on them. Rather by negotiating their own boundaries in the dancehall, by taking control of their bodies, and by communicating their power, they are demanding respect when confronted by those who do not believe they deserve it.

See also

References

External links
 Dancehall in Australia
 Dancehall Magazine
 International Reggae and World Music Awards Magazine

 
Caribbean music genres
Jamaican music
Reggae genres